Khvostovo is the name of several rural localities in Russia:

 Khvostovo, Kursk Oblast, village in Polevskoy Selsoviet Rural Settlement, Kursky District, Kursk Oblast
 Khvostovo, Vladimir Oblast, village in Kiprevskoye Rural Settlement, Kirzhachsky District, Vladimir Oblast
 Khvostovo, Beketovskoye Rural Settlement, Vozhegodsky District, Vologda Oblast, village in Beketovskoye Rural Settlement, Vozhegodsky District, Vologda Oblast
 Khvostovo, Yuchkinskoye Rural Settlement, Vozhegodsky District, Vologda Oblast, village in Yuchkinskoye Rural Settlement, Vozhegodsky District, Vologda Oblast